= Abdullah Al-Jabri =

Emirati footballer (born 1987)

Personal information
- Full name: Abdullah Abdulhadi Al-Jabri
- Date of birth: 13 July 1987 (age 39)
- Place of birth: United Arab Emirates
- Height: 1.69 m (5 ft 6 1/2 in)
- Position: Midfielder

Youth career
- 2003–2007: Al Ain

Senior career*
Years	Team	Apps	(Gls)
2007–2010	Al Ain		
2010–2011	Al Quwwat Al Musallaha		
2011–2018	Al Dhafra		
- * Club domestic league appearances and goals

Abdullah Al-Jabri (Arabic:عبد الله الجابري; born 13 July 1987) is an Emirati footballer who played as a midfielder.
